Ponyri is the name of several inhabited localities in Kursk Oblast, Russia.

Urban localities
Ponyri, Ponyrovsky District, Kursk Oblast, a work settlement in Ponyrovsky District

Rural localities
Ponyri, Fatezhsky District, Kursk Oblast, a khutor in Kolychevsky Selsoviet of Fatezhsky District